The following is a list of all urban rail transit systems in Latin America, ranked by passenger ridership. These kinds of systems are most commonly known as metro (or subway in English), but may also be known as subte, tren, or tranvía  systems. Daily and annual passengers ridership figures in this chart are based on annual and daily (not just weekday) average passenger trips. The year of the source date varies and is provided on the right.

Overall, Brazil has the largest number of metros, with 12 such systems, followed by Venezuela with 4 metro systems. The Mexico City Metro has the highest passenger ridership from a single operator in Latin America, and second in the Americas, after the New York City Subway. São Paulo is the city with the largest number of passengers carried by trains.

*Corresponds to the ridership source provided for each transit system, except for the Santiago Metro, because that system's current line 3 inaugurated on January 22, 2019.

See also
 List of North American light rail systems by ridership
 List of metro systems
 List of tram and light rail transit systems
 List of suburban and commuter rail systems

Notes

References

North American rapid transit systems by ridership
Rapid transit in Mexico
Rapid transit in Brazil
Rapid transit in Argentina
Rapid transit in Chile